Bajevica is a village situated in Novi Pazar municipality in Serbia.

External links
 Official website of Novi Pazar

References

Populated places in Raška District